Antoine Jaoude (born January 5, 1977) is Brazilian wrestler and a former mixed martial artist. He fought for the Southern California Condors in the, now defunct, International Fight League. His brother, Adrian, wrestled in WWE under the ring name Arturo Ruas.

Bio
Jaoude was born in Brazil to a Lebanese father and a Brazilian mother. Six months after his birth, his parents went with him to Lebanon to originally visit his paternal family for a short time. However, due to the civil war that broke out while they were there, they were only able to return to Brazil more than 13 years later, when he was 14. He represented Brazil in wrestling as an Olympian in the 2004 Athens Games, where he was the only South American wrestler. He was also a silver medalist in wrestling at the 2003 Pan American Games.

Mixed martial arts record

| Loss
| align=center | 8–3
| Roy Nelson
| KO (punch)
| IFL – World Grand Prix Finals
| 
| align=center | 2
| align=center | 0:22
| Uncasville, Connecticut, United States
|
|-
| Win
| align=center | 8–2
| Shane Ott
| Submission (arm-triangle choke)
| IFL – World Grand Prix Semifinals
| 
| align=center | 1
| align=center | 3:29
| Chicago, Illinois, United States
|
|-
| Win
| align=center | 7–2
| Dan Christison
| Decision (unanimous)
| IFL – Chicago
| 
| align=center | 3
| align=center | 4:00
| Chicago, Illinois, United States
|
|-
| Win
| align=center | 6–2
| Wayne Cole
| KO (punch)
| IFL – Los Angeles
| 
| align=center | 2
| align=center | 0:56
| Los Angeles, California, United States
|
|-
| Win
| align=center | 5–2
| Curtis Crawford
| Decision (unanimous)
| IFL – Oakland
| 
| align=center | 3
| align=center | 4:00
| Oakland, California, United States
|
|-
| Loss
| align=center | 4–2
| Travis Wiuff
| Decision (unanimous)
| Euphoria – USA vs World
| 
| align=center | 3
| align=center | 5:00
| Atlantic City, New Jersey, United States
|
|-
| Win
| align=center | 4–1
| Roman Zentsov
| TKO (injury)
| Euphoria – Road to the Titles
| 
| align=center | 1
| align=center | 3:33
| Atlantic City, New Jersey, United States
|
|-
| Loss
| align=center | 3–1
| Jefferson Silva
| Decision (split)
| K-1 Brazil – New Stars
| 
| align=center | 3
| align=center | 5:00
| Curitiba, Brazil
|
|-
| Win
| align=center | 3–0
| Kristof Midoux
| TKO (doctor stoppage)
| HOOKnSHOOT – Absolute Fighting Championships 2
| 
| align=center | 1
| align=center | 3:58
| Fort Lauderdale, Florida, United States
|
|-
| Win
| align=center | 2–0
| Rob Constance
| Decision (unanimous)
| RF 2 – Reality Fighting 2
| 
| align=center | 3
| align=center | 5:00
| Wildwood, New Jersey, United States
|
|-
| Win
| align=center | 1–0
| Lucio Cunha
| TKO (cut)
| BG 1 – Brazilian Gladiators 1
| 
| align=center | N/A
| align=center | N/A
| Sao Paulo, Brazil
|

References

External links
 

1977 births
Living people
Brazilian people of Lebanese descent
Brazilian emigrants to Lebanon
Brazilian male mixed martial artists
Heavyweight mixed martial artists
Mixed martial artists utilizing freestyle wrestling
Olympic wrestlers of Brazil
Wrestlers at the 2003 Pan American Games
Wrestlers at the 2004 Summer Olympics
Wrestlers at the 2011 Pan American Games
Brazilian male sport wrestlers
Pan American Games silver medalists for Brazil
Pan American Games medalists in wrestling
Medalists at the 2003 Pan American Games
Sportspeople of Lebanese descent